Aydıncık is a village in the Bolu District, Bolu Province, Turkey. Its population is 143 (2021).

References

Villages in Bolu District